Odontoglossum praenitens is a species of orchid endemic to Colombia.

praenitens